Autostrada A58, also called tangenziale Est Esterna di Milano, is the second ring road east of Milan after the A51, managed by the company Tangenziale Esterna S.p.a.

The A58 ring road connects, on the east side of Milan, the A4 with the A1 via the A35.

History 
On 11 June 2012, the first construction site of the external ring road opens. On 23 July 2014, the entire section of the A35 or BRE.BE.MI opens and with it also the first completed section of the external ring road, called "Arco TEEM, enters into operation.", to allow reaching the Pozzuolo Martesana and the Liscate barrier. The opening of the entire route took place on Saturday 16 May 2015, while 2016 was the deadline for the realization of all the related works.

References

Buildings and structures completed in 2014
2014 establishments in Italy
A58
Transport in Milan
Ring roads in Italy